Seven Days is a science fiction television created by Christopher and Zachary Crowe and produced by UPN. It premiered on October 7, 1998, and ran for three seasons and 66 episodes until May 29, 2001.

Series overview

Episodes

Season 1 (1998–99)

Season 2 (1999–2000)

Season 3 (2000–01)

References

 
 

Lists of American science fiction television series episodes